Sir Kenneth Skelton Anderson, 1st Baronet, KCMG (21 December 1866 – 9 December 1942) was a British shipowner and public servant. He was a manager of the Orient Steam Navigation Company and a director of Anderson, Green & Co., shipowners.

Educated at Harrow School and New College, Oxford, Anderson followed his father into the family business after his graduation. During the First World War, he served in numerous committees related to shipping, and was a close associate of the Shipping Controller, Sir Joseph Maclay.

Anderson was created a KCMG in 1909 and a baronet, of Ardtaraig in the County of Perth, in 1919. He was also a Commander of the Order of the Crown of Italy.

References 

 "Sir Kenneth Anderson", The Times, 11 December 1942, p. 7.

External links 

 

1866 births
1942 deaths
Baronets in the Baronetage of the United Kingdom
Knights Commander of the Order of St Michael and St George
Recipients of the Order of the Crown (Italy)
British businesspeople in shipping
20th-century British businesspeople
People educated at Harrow School
Alumni of New College, Oxford